The 2011–12 Liga de Honra, also known as Liga Orangina due to sponsorship reasons, was the 22nd season of the second-tier of football in Portugal. A total of 16 teams contested the league, 12 of which already had contested it in the 2009–10, and two of which were promoted from the Portuguese Second Division, and two of which were relegated from the 2010–11 Primeira Liga.

Teams

Changes in 2011–12

Teams relegated from 2010–11 Primeira Liga
 15th Place: Portimonense
 16th Place: Naval

Teams promoted to 2011–12 Primeira Liga
 Champions: Gil Vicente
 Runners-up: Feirense

Teams promoted from 2010–11 Segunda Divisão
 Champions: União da Madeira
 Runners-up: Atlético CP

Teams relegated to 2011–12 Segunda Divisão
 15th Place: Varzim
 16th Place: Fátima

Stadia and locations

Personnel and kits

Note: Flags indicate national team as has been defined under FIFA eligibility rules. Players and Managers may hold more than one non-FIFA nationality.

Managerial changes

League table

Positions by round

Results

Season statistics

Top goalscorers

Hat-tricks

Awards

Annual awards

LPFP Liga de Honra Player of the Year 
The LPFP Liga de Honra Player of the Year was awarded to Licá.

LPFP Liga de Honra Breakthrough Player of the Year 
The LPFP Liga de Honra Breakthrough Player of the Year was awarded to Miguel Rosa.

LPFP Liga de Honra Goalkeeper of the Year 
The LPFP Liga de Honra Goalkeeper of the Year was awarded to Vagner.

LPFP Liga de Honra Manager of the Year 
The LPFP Liga de Honra Coach of the Year was awarded to Marco Silva.

LPFP Liga de Honra Fairplay Award 
The LPFP Liga de Honra Fairplay Award was awarded to Moreirense.

See also
2011–12 Primeira Liga
2011–12 Segunda Divisão

References

Liga Portugal 2 seasons
Port
2011–12 in Portuguese football leagues